Nongshim RedForce is a South Korean professional League of Legends team owned by food and beverage company Nongshim. The team's name and logo are a reference to Nongshim's popular instant noodle brand Shin Ramyun.

For most of its history the team competed in Challengers Korea (CK), the second division of professional League of Legends in South Korea. However, as Team Dynamics, the team qualified for South Korea's primary league, League of Legends Champions Korea (LCK), after winning the 2020 LCK Summer promotion tournament. In late 2020 Riot Games Korea announced that Team Dynamics would be one of ten permanent franchise partners of the LCK. Nongshim became the main sponsor of Team Dynamics on 17 June 2020, and stated that it would acquire the team after the 2020 LCK season. On 17 December 2020, Team Dynamics was rebranded as Nongshim RedForce.

Current roster

Tournament results

Notes

References

External links 
 

Esports teams based in South Korea
League of Legends Champions Korea teams